Brown Bomber may refer to:
 Joe Louis, heavyweight boxing championship
 Brown Bomber (cocktail), a drink named after the boxer
 Andrew Fahie, a politician who adopted the nickname in homage to the boxer